The Men's +105 kilograms weightlifting event was the heaviest men's event at the 2008 Summer Olympics weightlifting competition, allowing competitors of over 105 kilograms of body mass. The whole competition took place on August 19, but was divided in two parts due to the number of competitors. Group B weightlifters competed at 15:30, and Group A, at 19:00. This event was the fifteenth and last weightlifting event to conclude.

Each lifter performed in both the snatch and clean and jerk lifts, with the final score being the sum of the lifter's best result in each. The athlete received three attempts in each of the two lifts; the score for the lift was the heaviest weight successfully lifted.

Schedule 
All times are China Standard Time (UTC+08:00)

Records

Results

References 

 Page 2690

Weightlifting at the 2008 Summer Olympics
Men's events at the 2008 Summer Olympics